is a Japanese anime television series produced by Lerche, directed by Seiji Kishi, and written by Makoto Uezu. The series aired on Fuji TV's Noitamina programming block from July 2 to September 17, 2015. The anime is inspired by the works of author Edogawa Ranpo and commemorates the 50th anniversary of his death in 1965.

Plot
The story begins at a middle school where the murder and dismemberment of a teacher has taken place. Kobayashi, a boy who goes to this school and the lead suspect in the case, meets the genius detective Akechi, who comes to the school to investigate. After being cleared of the crime, Kobayashi takes an interest in Akechi and, in spite of his friend Hashiba's worries, volunteers to be Akechi's assistant.

Characters

A genius 17-year-old detective who solves abnormal crimes for fun. The government has given him a special license in order to capitalize on his special investigative skills. He is regularly seen taking aspirin and guzzling coffee drinks.

A middle school boy who is often mistaken for a girl, he is blamed for dismembering his homeroom teacher. Much like Akechi, he is excited when he discovers that he can solve mysteries, and he's unfazed by morbid details of murder. Kobayashi asks to become Akechi's assistant if he can discover the real killer of his homeroom teacher.

A passionate boy who is best friends with Kobayashi. He is the heir to the rich Hashiba company and detests Akechi for being "cold hearted" at first. He is also against the idea of Kobayashi becoming Akechi's assistant and often looks out for Kobayashi. He is the class rep and is popular with girls. It is implied he has romantic feelings for Kobayashi.

The new homeroom teacher of Kobayashi and Hashiba. She's very cheerful in class and dresses up in a Lolita/cat-like style. Kobayashi notices cut marks on her wrists.

An investigator for the Tokyo Metropolitan Police Department. He has a strong sense of justice.

A perpetually stubbly police officer, friendly with Kagami.

An underworld figure with a fixation on Akechi.

A master of disguise. He's known as a "gentleman thief" and wanted by the police. He once befriended Kagami's little sister Tokiko. It is eventually revealed that he was stealing money in order to pay for an operation that saved the life of a girl named Sachiko who was terminally ill. Sachiko was later kidnapped, and Shadow-Man asked for Kobayashi's help to investigate her disappearance.

The medical examiner who delivers the results of autopsies in frantic scenes of exposition. Her personality is revealed to be much more twisted due to an incident where her little brother, who was terminally ill, committed suicide in order to make it less painful for her, but the plan backfired and caused her to become one of the Twenty Faces.

The demonstration dummy that Minami uses to show causes of death. It is revealed that it was an inspiration from Minami's dead brother.

Kagami's little sister. Kagami frequently receives calls from her on his cellphone. Later murdered as retaliation for her brother's involvement in her killer's prior arrest.

Akechi's junior high friend and the first Twenty Faces. He created the Dark Star after constant abuse from his father and school bullies.

Media

Anime
The anime television series produced by Lerche, directed by Seiji Kishi, and written by Makoto Uezu premiered on Fuji TV's Noitamina programming block on July 2, 2015. The anime is licensed by AnimeLab in Australia and New Zealand and is being simulcast on their website as it airs in Japan. The broadcast of the ninth episode was delayed one week due to a scheduling conflict with a sports program.

See also
Kogoro Akechi

Notes

References

External links
Official anime website 

2015 anime television series debuts
Adaptations of works by Edogawa Rampo
Fiction about monsters
Films with screenplays by Makoto Uezu
Funimation
Horror anime and manga
Lerche (studio)
Mystery anime and manga
Noitamina
Psychological anime and manga
Suicide in television